Template may refer to:

Tools
 Die (manufacturing), used to cut or shape material
 Mold, in a molding process
 Stencil, a pattern or overlay used in graphic arts (drawing, painting, etc.) and sewing to replicate letters, shapes or designs

Computing
 The main document from which mail merge documents are created
 Style sheet (web development) or master page, a sheet or page on which a user can globally edit and format graphic elements and text common to each page of a document
 Template (C++), a tool for generic programming in the C++ language
 Template (file format), a standardized, non-executable file type used by computer software as a pre-formatted example on which to base other files, especially documents
 Template (word processing), a standard document containing layout and styles used to configure word processing software
 Template metaprogramming, a programming technique used by a compiler to generate temporary source code
 Template method pattern, an object-oriented design pattern
 Template processor, a system that combines a template with data to produce an output
 Web template, a master page or a page element that can be used to produce web pages dynamically

Molecular genetics
 A strand of DNA which sets the genetic sequence of new strands during replication
 A strand of RNA which translates genes into proteins

Other uses
 A pre-developed page layout in electronic or paper media used to make new pages with a similar design, pattern, or style
 Boilerplate (text), any text that is or can be reused in new contexts or applications without being greatly changed from the original
 Template (novel), a novel by Matthew Hughes
 Template (racing), a device used in car racing to ensure that the body of the race vehicle adheres to specifications

See also
 Form letter, a letter written from a template
 Template engine (disambiguation)